The Barclay Curle Crane is a disused Titan or giant cantilever crane at the Barclay Curle shipyard at Whiteinch, Glasgow, Scotland.

History
It was built by Sir William Arrol & Co. in 1920. It is category A listed, and one of four such cranes remaining on the River Clyde.

Design

References

External links

 Barclay Curle & Company Limited, North British Engine Works, Diesel Quay, 739 South Street, Glasgow (Flickr Gallery)

Individual cranes (machines)
Buildings and structures in Glasgow
Category A listed buildings in Glasgow
Buildings and structures completed in 1920